Our Lady Help of Christians and St Denis Church  is a Roman Catholic parish church in St Marychurch, Torquay, Devon, England. It was built in 1869 and designed by Joseph Hansom in the Gothic Revival style. It is located between Priory Road and St Margaret's Road in St Marychurch. It is a Grade II* listed building.

History

Foundation
In 1864, Dominican nuns came to St Marychurch. They were invited by the Bishop of Plymouth William Vaughan. A house, Southampton Villa, was bought in the area. It housed the nuns, while an orphanage, St Mary's Priory, was built on the site.

Construction
In 1867, a Mr Potts Chatto, from the Daison estate, in thanksgiving for his son, Denis, recovering from a serious illness, paid for the construction of a church in the grounds of Southampton Villa. Joseph Hansom, who designed Plymouth Cathedral and Church of the Assumption of Our Lady, Torquay, was commissioned to design the church. In 1869, the church was opened. Southampton Villa was later demolished and the tower and spire of the church were built in its place. In 1871, a convent for the nuns next to the church was opened. The convent included a school and elementary school with a capacity for 200 children. An organ and lady chapel were later added to the church, they were paid for by Mrs Potts-Chatto.

Parish
The church is in the parish of Our Lady Help of Christians and St Denis. It has two Sunday Masses at 6:00pm on Saturday and 10:00am.

See also
 Diocese of Plymouth

References

External links
 

Buildings and structures in Torquay
Roman Catholic churches in Devon
Grade II* listed Roman Catholic churches in England
Grade II* listed churches in Devon
Gothic Revival church buildings in England
Gothic Revival architecture in Devon
Buildings by Joseph Hansom
1869 establishments in England
Roman Catholic churches completed in 1869
Religious organizations established in 1869
19th-century Roman Catholic church buildings in the United Kingdom